Wase (pronounced: Wasay) is a town and Local Government Area (LGA) of Plateau State, Nigeria, situated some 216 km south east of Jos, the Plateau State capital. It shares its name with the nearby Wase River. The population of the LGA was 159,861 people as of 2006, with an urban area of 1750 km².

History
The region of Wase was first inhabited by the Jukuns, centered around the traditional walled town of the same name. At first, Bashar was at it present location. She contained a chiefdom ruled by the Jukun in Mavo and lastly by Tarok in Kadarko this comes after the second crises between Tarok and Fulani. The Local Government Area was predominantly inhabited by Hausa Fulani, Burmawa and Jukun tribes. The minor tribes are the Tarok, and Basherawa. Later on Wase became part of the British Royal Niger Company protectorate (later Northern Nigeria) following the arrival of British troops in 1898. Wase was a part of Plateau Province when it was established in 1926, and then Plateau State upon Nigerian Independence in 1960.

Environment

Around 321 hectares (790 acres) of land around Wase is conserved for wildlife development and serves as a bird sanctuary - local species include the Rossy White Pelican. The protected land includes Wase Rock, a massive dome-shaped inselberg of volcanic origin standing at 350m in height, making it visible from a distance of some 40 km (25 miles).

The region is renowned for its mining activities due to a high concentration of lead, zinc, tin and other minerals. This has attracted considerable interest from Chinese investors who have constructed few local bridges and other infrastructure close to Wase's mining sites, although these services have not always reached the local community.

Population
The 2006 census population of Wase LGA was 159,861. There is a near-equal gender distribution (50.3% male) and a predominantly youthful population - 47.3% are younger than 15, whereas only 2.7% are aged 65 and over. The ethnic groups in Wase are the Hausa/Fulanis, Yankam, Tarok, Jukuns, and Boghoms. The major religions are Islam, Christianity, and the traditional African religion.

Local government council
The main tribal groups in the local council are the Fulani people ruled by an Emir, (Yankam) Basharawa people ruled by the Rekna, who use the Yankham language, and the Tarok ruled by Ponzhi. Emirs are selected by a council of seven kingmakers.
The 13th Emir of Wase was Alhaji (Dr.) Haruna Abdullahi Maikano.  He was nominated three months after the death of his father in September 2001, although this was not confirmed until the following year. 
He was assisted by the Rekna of Bashar, Alh. Adamu Idris, in conducting the affairs of the traditional council, who rule in the absence of the emir.
Haruna Abdullah died in September 2010 at the age of 64.
Alh Dr Muhammadu Sambo Haruna replaced late Dr Haruna Abdullah as the 14th Emir of Wase with effect from 28 October 2010.

Political Division
Administratively, Wase was divided into four districts, namely: Wase, Bashar, Lamba, and Kadarko. Each of these districts is headed by a district head known as the "Hakimi", while the various towns and villages in the districts are headed by a chief known as "Sarki". 
Currently the Rekna of Bashar is the oldest paramount traditional ruler.

References

Local Government Areas in Plateau State